Kenitra is a city in north western Morocco, formerly known as Port Lyautey from 1932 to 1956. It is a port on the Sebou river, has a population in 2014 of 431,282, is one of the three main cities of the Rabat-Salé-Kénitra region and the capital of the Kenitra Province. During the Cold War Kenitra's U.S. Naval Air Facility served as a stopping point in North Africa.

History

Ancient history

The history of the city begins with the foundation of a trading-post by the Carthaginian, known back then as Thamusida. Under the Antonine dynasty, a Venus temple was built there.

Before the French protectorate, the Kasbah Mahdiyya was the only construction in the area where the modern city can today be found.

Colonial and recent history
In March 1912 the French government and the Sultan of Morocco, Abd al-Hafid, signed the Treaty of Fez. Because of his growing unpopularity, the Sultan asked the French government for protection against the Berber rebel tribes surrounding Fez. France appointed Hubert Lyautey resident-general in Morocco.

General Lyautey restored peace and order to the country after crushing the tribal uprising. After safely moving the Sultan from Fez to the current capital city, Rabat, Lyautey began his task of civilian administration.

One of the first preoccupations of General Lyautey was to build ports along the inhabitable Atlantic coast where there were no natural harbors. He established Port Lyautey in 1912 as a French military fort and town. Its port, at the mouth of the Sebou river, was opened in 1913. It soon became the best river port in Morocco. Kenitra draws its name from a culvert built at Fouarat lake upstream of the kasbah. This culvert was destroyed in 1928. In 1933, the French officially named the locale "Port Lyautey".

It was renamed "Quneitra" in 1956 as Morocco gained its independence. The city has grown rapidly to be a shipping centre for agricultural produce (mainly fruit), fish, timber, and lead and zinc ores. The city's industrial area lies upstream of the port.

U.S. Naval Base

In November 1942, after Operation Torch, the Americans captured the Port Lyautey French fighter base as a military base, named Craw Field.  For three months the 21st Engineer Aviation Regiment worked on the airfield.  In February 1943 the Seabees of the 120th Naval Construction Battalion took over all construction activities. The Navy ran the base until 1947, when the State Department negotiated reversion of control to France. In 1950, a $23,000,000 expansion was authorized, but then the Korean War diverted resources. In the 1950s, nearly 10,000 people were on the base making it the largest aggregation of Americans in any one overseas base outside Japan. Later, the base in Kenitra was expanded to become a U.S. Naval Air Station.

The base was shared by both the US and Morocco through the Cold War. A small Navy communications out-station in Sidi Yahia closed in the late 1970s. The Air Station was closed in 1991.

Climate
Kenitra has a hot-summer Mediterranean climate (Köppen climate classification Csa).

Population

Areas and neighbourhoods

Mdina
 Khabazate
 The Cigogne
 La cite
Modern city
 Mimosa
 La Ville Haute
Popular districts
 Saknia
 Ouled Oujih
Maghrib al Arabi
Residential districts
Bir Rami
Ismailia
Val fleury

Education

Colleges and universities

 (UIT)
ENCG Kénitra
HECI Kénitra (Hautes Etudes Commerciales et Informatiques)
ENSA Kénitra (École nationale des sciences appliquées de Kénitra)
ENSC Kénitra ([École nationale supérieure de chimie de Kénitra]

Transportation
The National Route 1 and the A1 motorway pass through Kenitra and connect it to Rabat-Salé in the south-west and to Larache in the north-east.
The city is served by one railway station: Kenitra-Ville. A shuttle train, TNR, connects the city, every 30 minutes, to Rabat and Casablanca.
A high-speed rail line to Tangier was completed in 2018. (See Kenitra–Tangier high-speed rail line.)

Sports

Kenitra Athletic Club, KAC

In 1938, a group of Kenitra natives created KAC. 
This group of soccer lovers wanted to resist French domination in sports in Morocco.
The team, made entirely of Kenitra natives, succeeded in reaching the premier Moroccan soccer league in 1956. In 1960, KAC won its first championship league of Morocco. KAC embarked in a journey of glories by winning the 1973-81-82 championship leagues and the 1961 throne cup. 
Ahmed Souiri was a long-time manager and coach. KAC has produced many international players. 
Noureddine Bouyahyaoui and Labid Khalifa were among the players who helped the Moroccan national soccer team qualify for the second round of the World Cup finals in Mexico in 1986. Mohammed Boussati still holds a national record of goals by scoring 25 goals in one soccer championship season in 1981–82.
Its home is the Kenitra Municipal Stadium which has a capacity of 15,000 people.

Basketball 
The KAC Kénitra was a very successful basketball team during the 70s and 80s.

Natives from Kenitra
Kenitra was the birthplace of:
Saïd Aouita, Olympic athlete
Amina Aït Hammou, Olympic athlete
Youssef Chippo, International football player
Margie Cox, American R&B Singer
Mohamed Sijelmassi, writer and physician
David Bitan, Israeli politician
Nayef Aguerd – Moroccan footballer
Sofian Chakla – Moroccan footballer
Zouhair Laaroubi - Moroccan footballer
Tariq Chihab - Former international footballer
Karl Stephan - American artist and educator

See also
 Bouknadel
 Battle for Port Lyautey

Notes and references

External links

 Entry in Lexicorient
 Pictures of U.S. Naval base facilities in Kenitra
 Histoire de Kenitra / Port-Lyautey en images de 1911 au 1956

 
Port cities and towns on the Moroccan Atlantic Coast
Populated places in Kénitra Province
Municipalities of Morocco
1912 establishments in Morocco
Kenitra